Dance of the Dead is a 1992 fantasy horror novel by Christie Golden. Set in the world of Ravenloft, it is based on the Dungeons & Dragons game.

Plot summary
The story follows the adventures of Larisa Snowmane, a dancer who travels across the land of Ravenloft by ship.  The captain of the ship has evil intentions, however, and the ship comes to land at an island full of zombies.  Larisa, along with some of the living inhabitants of the island, must perform a magical dance called the Dance of the Dead to save herself from the captain.

Reception
Amos C. Patterson of Kliatt praised the book's story and character development, saying the novel would keep readers interested until the end.

References

1992 American novels
Novels by Christie Golden
Ravenloft novels